Michael Hoffman (born February 26, 1963) is a Canadian former professional ice hockey player.

Early life 
He was born in Barrie, Ontario. As a youth, he played in the 1976 Quebec International Pee-Wee Hockey Tournament with a minor ice hockey team from Barrie.

Career 
Hoffman played nine games in the National Hockey League with the Hartford Whalers between 1983 and 1986. The rest of his career, which lasted from 1983 to 1990, was mainly spent in the minor American Hockey League.

Career statistics

Regular season and playoffs

References

External links
 

1963 births
Living people
Barrie Colts players
Binghamton Whalers players
Brantford Alexanders players
Canadian ice hockey left wingers
EV Landsberg players
Flint Spirits players
Hartford Whalers draft picks
Hartford Whalers players
Ice hockey people from Simcoe County
Sportspeople from Barrie